The following events occurred in June 1903:

June 1, 1903 (Monday)
Born: Vasyl Velychkovsky, Ukrainian bishop and martyr, in Stanislav (died 1973)

June 2, 1903 (Tuesday)
An earthquake of 6.9 magnitude strikes the Alaska Peninsula, part of the territory of the United States.

June 3, 1903 (Wednesday)
English artist Laura Johnson marries painter Harold Knight.

June 4, 1903 (Thursday)

June 5, 1903 (Friday)

June 6, 1903 (Saturday)
Sir Edward Elgar conducts his oratorio, The Dream of Gerontius, at Westminster Cathedral, the first time it had been performed in London.
Born: Aram Khachaturian, Armenian composer, in Tiflis, Russian Empire (died 1978)

June 7, 1903 (Sunday)

June 8, 1903 (Monday)
Born: Marguerite Yourcenar, Belgian-French author, in Brussels (died 1987)

June 9, 1903 (Tuesday)
Trinity College, Dublin, announces its intention to accept women as full members in the following year. "Steamboat ladies" from Oxford and Cambridge would be among the first recipients.
Died: Gaspar Núñez de Arce, 68, Spanish poet

June 10, 1903 (Wednesday)
Born: Theo Lingen, German actor (d. 1978)

June 11, 1903 (Thursday)
Harry Vardon of Jersey wins the 1903 Open Championship golf tournament at Prestwick in Scotland.
Died:
King Alexander I of Serbia, 26, and his wife Queen Draga, 38, both shot dead in a coup d'état in Belgrade by conspirators from the Black Hand (Crna Ruka) society. 
Nikolai Bugaev, 65, Russian mathematician

June 12, 1903 (Friday)

June 13, 1903 (Saturday)
Italy's Prime Minister, Giuseppe Zanardelli, resigns after losing a vote in the Italian Chamber of Deputies; he reconsiders, and remains in the post until November.

June 14, 1903 (Sunday)

Heppner flood of 1903: The town of Heppner, Oregon, is nearly destroyed by a cloud burst that resulted in a flash flood that kills an estimated 247 people.

June 15, 1903 (Monday)

June 16, 1903 (Tuesday) 
In Germany's federal election, the Social Democratic Party (SPD) wins the popular vote, but the Centre Party remains the largest party in the Reichstag. 
In the Danish Folketing election, the Venstre Reform Party, under incumbent Council President Johan Henrik Deuntzer, wins 73 of the 114 seats.
Norwegian explorer Roald Amundsen sets off from Oslo in an attempt at the first east-west navigation of the Northwest Passage.
The Ford Motor Company is incorporated in Detroit by Henry Ford.

June 17, 1903 (Wednesday)
The British ironclad turret ship  founders in the Atlantic Ocean while being towed from the United Kingdom to the United States to be scrapped, and is lost. The Royal Navy ship had already been decommissioned, sunk as a target, and raised for its scrap value.

June 18, 1903 (Thursday)
Born:
Jeanette MacDonald, US singer and actress, in Philadelphia (died 1965)
Raymond Radiguet, French author, in Saint-Maur (died 1923)

June 19, 1903 (Friday)
The M1903 Springfield rifle is officially adopted by the United States military.
A minor earthquake (4.9 magnitude) strikes an area of North Wales, UK, centred on the town of Caernarfon. 
Born:
Lou Gehrig, American baseball player, in New York City (died 1941)
Wally Hammond, English cricketer, in Dover (died 1965)
Died: Herbert Vaughan, 71, English Catholic cardinal and Archbishop of Westminster

June 20, 1903 (Saturday)
US magazine The Saturday Evening Post begins its serialization of Jack London's third novel, The Call of the Wild.

June 21, 1903 (Sunday)
Born:
Al Hirschfeld, US caricaturist, in St Louis (died 2003)
Alf Sjöberg, Swedish theatre and film director, in Stockholm (died 1980)

June 22, 1903 (Monday)
Born:
John Dillinger, US gangster, in Indianapolis (died 1934)
Jiro Horikoshi, Japanese aircraft designer, in Fujioka (died 1982)
Ben Pollack, US jazz drummer and bandleader, in Chicago (died 1971)

June 23, 1903 (Tuesday)
Nadir of American race relations: George White, an African-American suspected of murdering Helen Bishop, a minister's daughter, is lynched in New Castle County, Delaware, United States.
Born: Anthony Veiller, US screenwriter and film producer, son of screenwriter Bayard Veiller and actress Margaret Wycherly, in New York City (died 1965)

June 24, 1903 (Wednesday)

June 25, 1903 (Thursday)
Born:
Pierre Brossolette, French journalist and resistance fighter, in Paris (died 1944)
George Orwell, English author, in Motihari, Bengal Presidency, British India, under the name Eric Arthur Blair (died 1950)

June 26, 1903 (Friday)

June 27, 1903 (Saturday)
19-year-old American socialite Aida de Acosta becomes the first woman to fly a powered aircraft solo when she pilots Santos-Dumont's motorized dirigible, “No. 9”, from Paris to Château de Bagatelle in France.
The Women's Singles competition at the 1903 U.S. National Championships tennis tournament is won by Elisabeth Moore (US).

June 28, 1903 (Sunday)

June 29, 1903 (Monday)
A meteorite fall, classification H5, is observed in Uberaba, Minas Gerais, Brazil.
The U.S. Open golf tournament is won by Willie Anderson of Scotland.
Born: Alan Blumlein, British electronics engineer, in London (died 1942)

June 30, 1903 (Tuesday)
A meteorite fall, classification L6, is observed in Rich Mountain (Watauga County, North Carolina), United States.

References

1903
1903-06
1903-06